Jai Jagannatha is a 2007 Indian Hindu mythological film directed by Sabyasachi Mohapatra, released in 15 languages. Besides Odia and Hindi, it's dubbed versions were released in English, Bengali, Assamese, Chhattisgarhi, Bhojpuri, Rajasthani, Punjabi, Gujarati, Marathi, Telugu, Tamil, Malayalam and Nepali languages.

Synopsis
The story of Jai Jagannatha is based on the ancient scripture Laxmi Puran. The untouchables were not allowed to pray, worship and do rituals to God in the ancient ages. Sriya, one of the important characters in this story, dares to pray and worship and wins over the support of Goddess Lakshmi. The real drama begins when Lakshmi is separated by Lord Jagannath at the behest of his brother Balram (Balabhadra) because she ends discrimination on earth by encouraging even untouchables to conduct rituals and worship.

As Lakshmi moves out of Jagannath’s household, Jagannath and Balram undergo immense suffering — so much so that they have to starve without water and food. The curse of Lakshmi had such a severe impact on the brothers that for 12 years they had a tough time. Soon they realised the importance of Lakshmi and were keen to bring her back to their abode. 
Lakshmi returned to Jagannath’s abode on one condition: There will be no discrimination of caste and creed on earth.

This unique story highlighted that for God everyone was equal besides it reflected the reforms and progressive stance of Gods from the ancient times. Only in the end through Narad it is revealed that Jagannath to end casteism and discrimination had "set up" these series of events which highlighted the social message besides the strength of true spirituality.

Cast
 Sritam Das as God Jagannath
 Jyoti Mishra  as Goddess Laxmi
 Pintu Nanda as God Balabhadra
 Mohini Shilalipi as Sriya Chandaluni
Sadhu Meher as Sriya's father-in-law
Sarat Pujari as Gajapati King
 Sehenawaj Khan as Royal Priest
 Birendra N. Gochhikar
 Mantu Mohapatra
 Debashish as Devarshi Narada
 Ratan Meher
 Monalisa
 Guna Mohapatra
 Hara Pattanaik
 Pradyumna Lenka
 Ramachandra Pratihari

Crew
Director: Sabyasachi Mohapatra
Presenter: Bharat Shah
Producer: B.Chintu Mohapatra
Writer: Sabyasachi Mohapatra
Editor: Rajendra K. Mohapatra
Music: Late Akshaya Mohanty
Background Score: Amar Haldipur
Cinematography :Aum Prakash Mohapatra
Sound: P. K. Misra
Publicity: Rahul Nanda & Himanshu Nanda
Banner: Mahapatra Movie Magic Pvt. ltd.
Distributor: Adlabs
Filming Location: Puri, Odisha & Umargaon

Awards
Odisha State Film Award: Best jury award & best editor award.

Reception
Jai Jagannatha, a movie directed by the director Sabyasachi Mohapatra is being released with a record number of 13 languages apart from originals in Odia and Hindi. Jai Jagannatha is a multilingual socio-mythological feature film. State of the art graphics, rich production values and divine music are the highpoints of Jai Jagannatha. This socio-mythological film has six songs in all.

References

External links
Film preview of Jai Jagannatha in www.bollywoodhungama.com
Preview of Jai Jagannatha in www.glamsham.com
Preview of Jai Jagannatha in in.movies.yahoo.com

 

2007 films
2000s Odia-language films
2000s Hindi-language films
Hindu mythological films
Films scored by Akshaya Mohanty
Films directed by Sabyasachi Mohapatra
Indian multilingual films